A List of Great Basin Divide border landforms of Nevada.

Two sections cover Nevada, the north-northeast section with Oregon, Idaho, and Utah, and the southeast Nevada section, with Utah and California.

North-northeast Nevada list
From west to east

 Independence Mountains
 Jarbidge Mountains
 Jarbidge Wilderness
 Snake Mountains
 Delano Mountains
 Utah state line

Southern Nevada list 

Alphabetic
 Cedar Range
 Clover Mountains
 Clover Mountains Wilderness
 Delamar Mountains
 Desert National Wildlife Refuge
 Desert Range
 Eldorado Mountains
 Eldorado Valley-(NNE water divide)
 Fairview Range (Lincoln County)
 Grant Range
 Highland Range (Clark County)
 Ivanpah Valley, (endorheic north)-(from Jean Pass (north) to Roach Lake-(south))
 Lake Valley (Nevada)
 Las Vegas Valley (landform)-((northwest-headwater)-Las Vegas Wash)
 McCullough Range
 New York Mountains
 Pintwater Range
 Schell Creek Range
 Sheep Range
 Snake Mountains
 Specter Range
 Spotted Range
 Spring Mountains
 White Pine Range
 White Rock Mountains
 Wilson Creek Range

See also
 Great Basin Divide
 Great Basin

References

 DeLorme, Nevada Atlas & Gazetteer, DeLorme, c. 2010, 72 pp.

External links
Piute Wash Watershed, Nevada to California, cfpub.epa.gov
Las Vegas Wash Watershed, cfput.epa.gov

Great Basin Divide